The Snow River is a  tributary of Kenai Lake in the U.S. state of Alaska. Beginning in the Kenai Mountains of the Kenai Peninsula, it flows southwest through Chugach National Forest where its main and south forks join to near Primrose at the southern inlet of the lake. Along its final reaches, the river intersects the Iditarod Trail and passes under the Seward Highway. The glacier from which it flows has an associated glacial dammed lake that releases every few years, often causing flooding in Primrose and Kenai Lake.

See also
List of rivers of Alaska

References

External links
 Primrose Campground – U.S. Forest Service
 Snow River Near Seward – National Weather Service

Rivers of Kenai Peninsula Borough, Alaska
Rivers of the Kenai Peninsula
Rivers of Alaska